Unitas '30 is an association football club from Etten Leur, Netherlands. It was founded on 10 May 1930 as Sparta. Since 2022 it plays for the first time in its history in the Vierde Divisie, still known as Hoofdklasse when it secured the promotion.

References 

Football clubs in the Netherlands
Association football clubs established in 1930
1930 establishments in the Netherlands
Sport in Etten-Leur
Football clubs in North Brabant